Mosquito most commonly refers to flying insects of the family Culicidae.

Mosquito may also refer to:

Arts and entertainment
Mosquito (film), a 1995 science fiction film directed by Gary Jones
The Mosquito (film), a 1954 West German drama film
Mosquitos (band), a New York City-based musical band
Mosquitoes (novel), a 1927 novel by William Faulkner

Albums
Mosquito (Psychotic Waltz album), a 1994 album by Psychotic Waltz
Mosquito (Michael Kulas album), a 1995 album by Michael Kulas
Mosquito (Yeah Yeah Yeahs album), a 2013 album by the Yeah Yeah Yeahs
Mosquitos (album), an album by Stan Ridgway

Songs
 "The Mosquito" (song), a song by The Doors from their studio album Full Circle, 1972
 "Mosquito", a song from SR-71's Japan-only album Here We Go Again
 "Mosquito", a song from Red Velvet's EP Summer Magic

Places

United States
Mosquito, California, in Calaveras County
Mosquito County, original name of Orange County, Florida
Mosquito Creek (disambiguation), various creeks in the US
Mosquito Lagoon, Florida
Mosquito Range, Rocky Mountains range in central Colorado
Mosquito Pass, a high mountain pass in the Mosquito Range

Multiple countries
 Mosquito River (disambiguation)

Elsewhere
Mosquito, Newfoundland and Labrador, a settlement in Canada
Mosquito Coast, in Central America
Point Mosquitos ( or Mosquito), on the Caribbean coast of Panama
Mosquito Mound, a volcano in Canada
Mosquito Island, a nickname for Selirong Island in Temburong District, Brunei

People
Sam Bockarie (1964–2003), Sierra–Leonean rebel leader nicknamed "Mosquito"
Carlos Domingos Massoni (1933–2001), Brazilian basketball player nicknamed "Mosquito"
Coco Mosquito, stage name of Croatian musician, Gordan Muratović
Emilia Mosquito (born 1982), Swedish film director
Mosquito (footballer), Brazilian footballer
Irving Mosquito (born 2000), Australian footballer
Musquito or Mosquito, Indigenous Australian resistance leader
Yvonne Mosquito (born 1964), British politician

Transportation

Aviation
ABC Mosquito, a 1916 British aircraft engine
de Havilland Mosquito, a twin-engine British fighter-bomber during WW II
Glasflügel Mosquito, a German-manufactured glider
Golden Gate Mosquito, an American ultralight aircraft
Innovator Mosquito Air, a Canadian ultralight home-built helicopter
Mosquito Aviation XE, an ultralight home-built turbine powered helicopter
Partenavia Mosquito, Italian, two-seat, civil, trainer aircraft
Swedish Aerosport Mosquito, powered hang glider
T-6 Mosquito, the designation for the North American T-6 Texan trainer when used as a combat aircraft

Rail
Mosquito, a GWR Metropolitan Class locomotive

Military
de Havilland Mosquito, a British Second World War aircraft
HMS Mosquito, twelve Royal Navy ships
USS Mosquito (1775), a sloop of the Continental Navy
USS Mosquito (1822), a barge or cutter in the West Indies Squadron
Mosquito Fleet, several groups of ships in US naval and maritime history
HMQS Mosquito, a torpedo boat operated by the Queensland Maritime Defence Force and the Commonwealth Naval Forces
Mosquito (missile), an Italian anti-tank guided missile which entered service in 1961
Spirit Mosquito, a British UCAV formerly in development by Spirit AeroSystems Belfast

Sports
Manchester Mosquitoes, British, Australian Rules Football club
The Mosquitos, nickname of the Papua New Guinea national Australian rules football team

Other uses
MOSQUITO, a cryptographic cypher algorithm
The Mosquito, an audio device to discourage loitering

See also
Mister Mosquito, a 2001 PlayStation 2 game
SIG Sauer Mosquito, a .22 caliber handgun
Focke-Wulf Ta 154 Moskito, a German World War II aircraft
P-270 Moskit, Russian cruise missile
Miskito (disambiguation)
Moskito (disambiguation)
El Mosquito, an Argentine newspaper